"First Time for Everything" is a song recorded by American country music group Little Texas.  It was released in February 1992 as the second single and title track from their debut album  First Time for Everything.  It was written by the band's lead guitarist Porter Howell and rhythm guitarist Dwayne O'Brien. The song peaked at number 13 on the Billboards Hot Country Songs chart and reached number 18 on the Canadian RPM country Tracks chart in 1992.

Music video
The music video was directed by Charles Randazzo and premiered in early 1992.

Chart performance
"First Time for Everything" debuted on the U.S. Billboard Hot Country Singles & Tracks for the week of February 15, 1992.

References

1992 singles
Little Texas (band) songs
Song recordings produced by James Stroud
Warner Records Nashville singles
Songs written by Dwayne O'Brien
Songs written by Porter Howell
1991 songs